WRDE-FM (103.9 MHz) is an American radio station in the Delmarva region of Maryland. The station is licensed to serve Berlin, Maryland, although its studios and main offices are located in the larger nearby city of Salisbury.

On March 1, 2022, the then-WOCQ dropped its "OC104" top 40 format and began stunting with a loop directing listeners to hot adult contemporary-formatted WBOC-FM 102.5 Princess Anne.

WOCQ changed its call sign to WRDE-FM on March 3, 2022. On March 4, 2022, at 12 noon, WRDE-FM ended stunting and launched a country music format, branded as "Coast Country 103.9/106.3" (with a simulcast on WCEM-FM 106.3 FM Cambridge).

Its transmitter tower stands  and is located in Whaleyville.

Air personalities
The station features Big D and Bubba in the morning and April Brilliant and Gary John during the day, both who have broadcast on Delmarva radio for decades.

Prior format
103.9 OC104 was formatted as a Top 40 radio station, playing artists such as Machine Gun Kelly, Maroon 5, Flo Rida, The Weeknd, Beyonce, Justin Bieber, Imagine Dragons, Ariana Grande, and Billie Eillish.

Transmitter
The transmitter is a class A transmitter, 6,000 watts, HAAT 100 meters, located in Whaleyville, Maryland., located on coordinates 38.383°N 75.316°W Coordinates: 38.383°N 75.316°W.

WOCQ-HD2
On April 3, 2017, WOCQ-HD2 launched an oldies format, branded as "Kool Oldies 104.3 & 105.1", simulcasting on translators W282AW 104.3 FM Salisbury and W286BB 105.1 FM Ocean City. It featured Scott Brocato and Ernesto Garcia during the day, with Dick Clark, Wolfman Jack and Greatest Hits USA on weekends.

On March 1, 2022, WOCQ-HD2 and its translators changed their format from oldies to a simulcast of classic hits-formatted WTDK 107.1 FM Federalsburg, branded as "The Duck".

Previous logos

References

External links
Adams Radio Stations

Salisbury, Maryland
Ocean City, Maryland
RDE-FM
Radio stations established in 1982
1982 establishments in Maryland
Country radio stations in the United States